The Pomeroy Subdivision is a railroad line owned by CSX Transportation in the U.S. state of Ohio. At both its west and east ends, the line continues as the Kanawha River Railroad West Virginia Secondary.

See also
 List of CSX Transportation lines

References

CSX Transportation lines
Rail infrastructure in Ohio